Bar Louie is an American bar and restaurant chain founded in 1990. Bar Louie serves food, beer, and cocktails, from locations predominantly located in urban and suburban markets.  there are approximately 69 locations. Bar Louie is headquartered in Addison, Texas, and Tom Fricke is the company's chief executive officer. Sun Capital Partners is a major investor in the company dating back to June 2010.

On January 27, 2020, Bar Louie filed for bankruptcy and closed 38 locations. During the COVID-19 pandemic, Bar Louie closed an additional 22 locations.

References

Restaurant chains in the United States
Restaurants established in 1990
Companies based in Addison, Texas
Companies that filed for Chapter 11 bankruptcy in 2020